The following outline is provided as an overview of and topical guide to Prague:

Prague – capital and largest city in the Czech Republic. With about 1.3 million residents within an area of 496 km2 (192 sq mi), it has the status of a statutory city. Prague is classified as a "Beta+" global city according to GaWC studies, and is the fifth most visited European city after London, Paris, Istanbul and Rome.

General reference 
 Pronunciation: ;  ;
 Common English name(s): Prague
 Official English name(s): Prague
 Adjectival(s): Praguer
 Demonym(s): Praguer

Geography of Prague 

Geography of Prague
 Prague is:
 a city
 a statutory city
 capital of the Czech Republic
 Population of Prague: 1,280,508
 Area of Prague: 496 km2 (192 sq mi)
 Atlas of Prague

Location of Prague 

 Prague is situated within the following regions:
 Northern Hemisphere and Eastern Hemisphere
 Eurasia
 Europe (outline)
 Central Europe
 Czech Republic (outline)
 Bohemia
 Time zone(s): 
 Central European Time (UTC+01)
 In Summer (DST): Central European Summer Time (UTC+02)

Environment of Prague 

 Climate of Prague

Natural geographic features of Prague 

 Hills in Prague
 Letná
 Petřín
 Islands in Prague
 Kampa Island
 Střelecký Island
 Rivers in Prague
 Vltava

Areas of Prague 

Districts of Prague
 New Town
 Old Town

Locations in Prague 

 Tourist attractions in Prague
 Museums in Prague
 Shopping areas and markets
 World Heritage Sites in Prague
 Hradčany

Bridges in Prague 

Bridges in Prague
 Charles Bridge
Statues on Charles Bridge
 Jirásek Bridge
 Legion Bridge
 Libeň Bridge
 Mánes Bridge
 Nusle Bridge
 Palacký Bridge
 Svatopluk Čech Bridge
 Troja Bridge
 Vyšehrad railway bridge

Castles in Prague 

Castles in Prague
 Prague Castle
 First courtyard of Prague Castle
Matthias Gate
Wrestling Titans
 Second courtyard of Prague Castle
Kohl's Fountain
 Third courtyard of Prague Castle
Obelisk
 Fourth courtyard of Prague Castle
 Golden Lane
 Royal Garden of Prague Castle
 Spanish Hall
 Vladislav Hall

City gates and walls of Prague 

 Hunger Wall
 Lennon Wall
 Písek Gate
 Powder Tower

Cultural and exhibition centres in Prague 
 Prague Congress Centre

Forts of Prague 

 Vyšehrad

Fountains in Prague 
 Kohl's Fountain
 Kranner's Fountain
 Wimmer's Fountain

Monuments and memorials in Prague 

 František Palacký Monument
 Jan Hus Memorial
 Memorial of the Second Resistance Movement
 Memorial to the Victims of Communism
 Monument to Soviet Tank Crews
 National Monument in Vitkov
 Statue of Bedřich Smetana
 Statue of John of Nepomuk
 Statue of Tomáš Garrigue Masaryk
 Statue of Saint George
 Vítězslav Hálek Memorial
 Winged Lion Memorial

Museums and art galleries in Prague 

Museums in Prague
 Antonín Dvořák Museum
 Bedřich Smetana Museum
 City of Prague Museum
Langweil's Model of Prague
 Czech Police Museum
 Franz Kafka Museum
 Galerie Cesty ke světlu
 Josef Sudek Gallery
 Kepler Museum
 Museum Kampa
 Museum of Communism
 Museum of Decorative Arts in Prague
 Galerie Rudolfinum
 Náprstek Museum
 National Gallery in Prague
 National Museum
Lapidarium
 National Technical Museum
 Prague Aviation Museum
 Galerie Rudolfinum
 The Václav Špála Gallery

Palaces and villas in Prague 

 Bertramka
 Clam-Gallas Palace
 Czernin Palace
 Dolní Počernice
 Kinský Palace
 Kolowrat Palace
 Letohrádek Hvězda
 Liechtenstein Palace (Kampa Island)
 Liechtenstein Palace (Malostranské náměstí)
 Lobkowicz Palace
 Morzin Palace
 Old Royal Palace
 Schebek Palace
 Schönborn Palace
 Troja Palace
 Villa Müller
 Wallenstein Palace
 Žofín Palace

Parks and gardens in Prague 

 Aquapalace Prague
 Kampa Park
 Letná Park
Prague Metronome
 Obora Hvězda
 Park of National Awakening
 Parukářka Park
 Seminary Garden
 Stromovka

Public squares in Prague 

Public squares in Prague
 Charles Square
 Hradčany Square
 Jan Palach Square
 Malé náměstí
 Malostranské náměstí
 Náměstí Republiky
 Old Town Square
 St. George's Square
 Wenceslas Square

Religious buildings in Prague 

Churches in Prague
 All Saints Church
 Basilica of St. Peter and St. Paul
 Basilica of the Assumption
 Břevnov Monastery
 Cathedral of Saint Lawrence
 Church of Our Lady before Týn
 Church of Our Lady of the Snows
 Church of Saint Michael the Archangel in Prague
 Church of St. James the Greater
 Church of St. Martin in the Wall
 Church of St. Apollinaire
 Church of Sts. Simon and Jude
 Church of the Most Sacred Heart of Our Lord
 Hus' House
 Ss. Cyril and Methodius Cathedral
 St. Clement's Cathedral
 St. George's Basilica
 St. George's Convent
 St. Giles' Church
 St. Longin's Rotunda
 St. Nicholas Church (Malá Strana)
 St. Nicholas Church (Staré Město)
 St. Salvator Church
 St Thomas' Church
 St. Vitus Cathedral
Bohemian Crown Jewels
Crown of Saint Wenceslas
Treasury of St. Vitus Cathedral
 St. Wenceslas Church
 Strahov Monastery

Secular buildings in Prague 

 A Studio Rubín
 Barrandov Terraces
 Clementinum
National Library of the Czech Republic 
 City Tower
 City Empiria
 Dancing House
 Domovina
 Golden Angel
 House at the Two Golden Bears
 House of the Black Madonna
 Invalidovna
 Karolinum
 Molochov
 Municipal House
 Municipal Library of Prague
 New Town Hall
 Old Town Hall
Prague astronomical clock
 Pankrác Prison
 Planetárium Praha
 Prague City Archives
 Prague Towers
 Rangherka
 Rezidence Eliška
 Rudolfinum
 Škoda Palace
 Štefánik's Observatory
 Stone Bell House
 Transgas (building)
 V Tower
 Valkounsky House
 Výstaviště Praha

Streets in Prague 

 Celetná
 Na příkopě
 Národní

Theatres in Prague 

 Broadway Theatre
 Divadlo DISK
 Divadlo na Fidlovačce
 The Drama Club
 Estates Theatre
 Laterna Magika
 Millennium Theatre
 Musical Theatre Karlín
 National Marionette Theatre
 National Theatre
 Provisional Theatre
 Semafor
 Spejbl and Hurvínek Theatre
 Theatre on the Balustrade
 Vinohrady Theatre

Towers in Prague 

Tallest structures in Prague
 Malá Strana Bridge Tower
 Old Town Bridge Tower
 Petřín Lookout Tower
 Vinohrady Water Tower
 Žižkov Television Tower

Demographics of Prague 

Demographics of Prague

Government and politics of Prague 

Politics of Prague
 Mayors of Prague

International relations of Prague 

International relations of Prague

Law and order in Prague 
 Prague Castle Guard

Military in Prague

History of Prague 

History of Prague

History of Prague, by period or event 

Timeline of Prague
 Beginnings and early Middle Ages
The Přemyslid dynasty rules most of Bohemia (900–1306)
The reign of Charles IV, of the Luxembourg dynasty (1346–1378) 
First Defenestration of Prague (1419)
Holy Roman Emperor Rudolf II, of the House of Habsburg, is elected King of Bohemia in 1576, and moves the Habsburg capital from Vienna to Prague in 1583.
Second Defenestration of Prague (1618)
 Prague during the 18th century
 Prague during the 19th century
 Prague during the 20th century
1945 Bombing of Prague (1945)
Prague uprising (1945)
Prague Spring (1968)
 Contemporary Era
Velvet Revolution (1989)

History of Prague, by subject 

 History of the Jews in Prague

Culture of Prague 

Culture of Prague
 Prague underground (culture)

Arts in Prague

Architecture of Prague 

List of tallest buildings in Prague

 Art Nouveau architecture in Prague
Hotel Paris
Municipal House
 Baroque architecture in Prague
Clementinum
Troja Palace
Wallenstein Palace
 Gothic architecture in Prague
Powder Tower
 Neoclassical architecture in Prague
Petschek Palace
 Neo-Renaissance architecture in Prague
Schebek Palace
Žofín Palace
 Postmodern architecture in Prague
Dancing House

Cinema of Prague 

 Barrandov Studios
 Febiofest
 One World Film Festival
 Prague Independent Film Festival
 Prague Studios

Literature of Prague 
 Prague linguistic circle

Music and ballet of Prague 
 

 Ballet of Prague
 National Theatre Ballet
 Music festivals in Prague
 Prague Autumn International Music Festival
 Prague International Jazz Festival
 Prague International Organ Festival
 Prague Spring International Music Festival
 Music schools in Prague
Prague Conservatory 
 Music venues in Prague
 National Theatre
 Rudolfinum
 State Opera
 Musical compositions dedicated to Prague
 Wolfgang Amadeus Mozart's Prague Symphony
 Musical ensembles in Prague
 Band of the Castle Guards and the Police of the Czech Republic
 Berg Orchestra
 Bohemian Symphony Orchestra Prague
 City of Prague Philharmonic Orchestra
 Czech National Symphony Orchestra 
 Czech Philharmonic
 Praga Sinfonietta Orchestra
 Prague Philharmonia
 Prague Philharmonic Orchestra
 Prague Quartet
 Prague Radio Symphony Orchestra
 Prague Symphony Orchestra
 Musicians from Prague
 Ignaz Moscheles
 Josef Mysliveček
 Wolfgang Amadeus Mozart and Prague

Theatre of Prague 

 Black light theatre
 Prague Quadrennial

Visual arts of Prague 

 Czech Cubism
 Prague Biennale

Public art in Prague
 Libuše and Přemysl
 Polibek
 Youth
 Záboj and SlavojCuisine of Prague

 Beer in Prague
 Prague Ham
 Wine in Prague
 
Events in Prague
 Prague Fringe Festival
 Prague Writers' Festival
 Signal Festival
 Summer Shakespeare Festival

Languages of Prague
 Czech language
 Prague German language

Media in Prague
 Newspapers in PragueLidové novinyPrager Zeitung''
 Radio and television in Prague
 Prima televize

People from Prague
 List of people from Prague
 Václav Havel
 Jaroslav Heyrovský
 Karl Deutsch
 Rainer Maria Rilke

Religion in Prague 

Religion in Prague
 Catholicism in Prague
Bishops and archbishops of Prague
Roman Catholic Archdiocese of Prague
 St. Vitus Cathedral
 Judaism in Prague
 Jubilee Synagogue
Old New Synagogue

Sports in Prague 

Sport in Prague

 Football in Prague
 Association football in Prague
AC Sparta Prague
SK Slavia Prague
 Prague derby
 Ice hockey in Prague
 HC Sparta Praha
 HC Slavia Praha
 Sports competitions in Prague
 Prague Half Marathon
 Prague Marathon
 Prague Golf Challenge
 Prague Open
 Sports venues in Prague
 Eden Arena
 Generali Arena
 Královka Arena
 O2 Arena
 Tipsport Arena

Economy and infrastructure of Prague 

Economy of Prague
 Communications in Prague
 Prague pneumatic post

 Financial services in Prague
 Czech National Bank
 Prague Stock Exchange
 Hotels in Prague
 Corinthia Hotel Prague
 Four Seasons Hotel
 Hilton Prague
 Hotel InterContinental Prague
 Hotel International Prague
 Hotel Olympik
 Hotel Paris
 Radisson Blu Alcron Hotel
 Restaurants and cafés in Prague
 Allegro
 Café Slavia
 La Degustation
 U Fleků
 Výtopna
  Shopping malls and markets in Prague
 Centrum Chodov
 Dejvická Farmers' Market
 Kotva Department Store
 Nový Smíchov
 Obchodní centrum Letňany
 Palladium
 Tourism in Prague

Transportation in Prague 

Transportation in Prague
 Public transport in Prague
 Public transport operators in Prague
 Air transport in Prague
 Airports in Prague
Prague Airport
 Road transport in Prague
 Bus transport in Prague
 Trolleybuses in Prague

Rail transport in Prague 

Rail transport in Prague
 Petřín funicular
  Prague Metro
  Line A
  Line B
  Line C
  Line D (proposed line)
List of Prague Metro stations
 Railway stations in Prague
 Praha hlavní nádraží
 Praha-Holešovice railway station
 Praha Masarykovo nádraží
 Praha-Smíchov railway station
 Trams in Prague

Education in Prague 

Education in Prague
 Universities in Prague
 Charles University
 Czech Technical University in Prague
 Metropolitan University Prague
 University of Business in Prague
 University of Economics
 University of Finance and Administration
 Research institutes in Prague
 Czech Academy of Sciences

Healthcare in Prague 

 Hospitals in Prague
 Bulovka Hospital
 Motol University Hospital
 Psychiatric Clinic in Prague

See also 

 Outline of geography

References

External links 

Prague
Prague
 1